The following lists events that happened during 2000 in Pakistan.

Incumbents

Federal government
President: Muhammad Rafiq Tarar
Chief Justice: Saeeduzzaman Siddiqui (until 26 January), Irshad Hasan Khan

Governors
Governor of Balochistan – Amir-ul-Mulk Mengal
Governor of Khyber Pakhtunkhwa – Mohammad Shafiq (until 15 August); Iftikhar Hussain Shah (starting 15 August)
Governor of Punjab – Muhammad Safdar 
Governor of Sindh – Azim Daudpota (until 24 May); Muhammad Mian Soomro (starting 25 May)

Events

April
After military takeover, Former Prime Minister Nawaz Sharif is sentenced to life imprisonment.

October
13 October – Pakistan's supreme court rules that the 1999 coup d'état was justified.

December
Nawaz Sharif goes into exile to Saudi Arabia.

Births

Deaths
13 August – Nazia Hassan, pop-singer, cancer
23 December – Madam Noor Jahan, playback singer

References

 
Pakistan